Aalta Phoring is an Indian Bengali drama television series on Star Jalsha which premiered on 10 January 2022. It is produced by Susanta Das under the banner of Tent Cinema. It stars Kheyali Mondal, Arnab Banerjee and Saoli Chattopadhyay. From October 2022, the show is starring Abhishek Bose as a new lead.

Plot 
The show evolves around the struggles of Phoring, a gymnast girl facing many problems in her life.

Cast

Main 

 Kheyali Mondal as
 Aalta Phoring Chatterjee (née Naskar)  – an aspiring gymnastician, Abhra's ex-wife,Arjun's wife; Radha's daughter, Deepankar's daughter in-law (2022 – 2023)
 Johnny Naskar – Phoring's estranged twin sister (2023)

 Abhishek Bose as Arjun Chatterjee; formerly (Mukherjee) - A boxer, Phoring's rescuer and second husband, Deepankar's son, Radha's son-in-law. (2022 – 2023)
 Saoli Chattopadhyay as Radharani Naskar – Phoring's mother, an ex-gymnastician, Abhra's mother in-law (2022 – 2023)
 Arnab Banerjee as Abhradeep Chatterjee aka Abhra aka Babu/Bank Babu – a bank employee, Sankar and Suchitra's son, Phoring's ex-husband turned rival. (2022 – 2023) (Deceased)

Recurring 
 Ayendri Lavnia Roy as Poushali Mitra aka Maamuni – Abhra's love interest and Phoring's rival (2022)
 Ashmita Baidya as Neha Chatterjee – Abhra's widow (2022 – 2023)
Amitabh Bhattacharjee as Nirmal Banerjee – Pupu's husband, Babiya and Phoring's father, Radha's rival (2022 - 2023)
Poushmita Goswami as Pushpita Banerjee aka Pupu – Nirmal's wife, Babiya's mother and Phoring's step mother and rival, Radha's rival (2022 – 2023)
Moupiya Goswami as Babiya – Nirmal and Pupu's daughter, Sagar's love interest, Phoring's step sister (2022 – 2023)
Arun Banerjee as Deepankar Chatterjee – head of Chatterjees, Abhra's eldest paternal uncle;Arjun's father (2022 – present)
Raunak Dey Bhowmick as Sagar Chatterjee – Abhra's youngest cousin brother, Chinmoy's son (2022 – 2023)
Tulika Basu as Suchitra Chatterjee – Somu and Abhra's mother, Sankar's wife (2022 – 2023)
Surajit Banerjee as Sankar Chatterjee – Somu and Abhra's father, Suchitra's husband (2022 – 2023)
Sudip Sarkar as Soumitra Chatterjee aka Somu – Abhra's elder brother, Amrita's husband (2022)
Misty Singh as Amrita Chatterjee – Somu's wife, Sankar and Suchitra's eldest daughter-in-law, Abhra's elder sister-in-law (2022 – 2023)
Chandraniv Mukherjee as Swarup Chatterjee – Kinkar's son, Mandira's husband, Abhra's elder cousin brother, a drunker (2022)
Nandini Saha as Mandira Chatterjee – Swarup's wife (2022 – 2023)
Koushik Bhattacharya as Chinmoy Chatterjee – Sagar's father, Abhra's youngest paternal uncle (2022 – 2023)
Bonhi Chakraborty as Chinmoy's wife, Sagar's mother, Abhro's youngest peternal aunt (2022 – 2023)
Arindal Bagchi as Kinkar Chatterjee – Swarup's father, Abhra's younger peternal uncle, Mandira's father-in-law (2022 – 2023))
Rumpa Chatterjee as Kinkar's wife, Swarup's mother, Mandira's mother-in-law (202)
Sanjukta Roy Chowdhury as Abhra's paternal aunt (2022)
Gargi Kundu as Dolon – care taker of Chatterjees (2022)
Rimjhim Mitra as Amrapali Chowdhury aka Pali – Abhra's new boss and one sided lover (2022)
Ranjini Chatterjee as Poushali's mother (2022)
Subrata Mitra as Poushali's father (2022)
Mouli Dutta as Arjun's sister (2022)
Chumki Chowdhury as Arjun's mother (2022)

Raja Goswami as Animesh (2023)
Nandini Dutta as Rini (2023)

Reception

TRP Ratings

Adaptations

References

External links
Aalta Phoring at Disney+ Hotstar

Star Jalsha original programming
2022 Indian television series debuts
Indian drama television series
Television shows set in Kolkata
Bengali-language television programming in India